In the Beginning There Was Rhythm may refer to:

 In the Beginning There Was Rhythm (album), 2002 compilation album by various artists
 "In the Beginning There Was Rhythm / Where There's a Will...", 1980 split-single by The Pop Group and The Slits